Daskroi is one of the 182 Legislative Assembly constituencies of Gujarat state in India. It is part of Ahmedabad district.

List of segments
This assembly seat represents the following segments,

 Ahmedabad City Taluka (Part) – Ahmedabad Municipal Corporation (Part) Ward No. – Naroda (OG) 45, Nikol (OG) 46.
 Daskroi Taluka (Part) Villages –
Hanspura, Enasan, Bilasiya, Pardhol, Vahelal, Huka, Navarangpura, Zanu, Lalpur, Bharkunda, Pasunj, Kubadthal, Bhuvaldi, Kuha, Chandial, Kanial, Vadod, Bhavda, Harnivav, Undrel, Ranodra, Govindada, Chavlaj, Bhuval, Hirapur, Badodara, Geratpur, Ropda, Aslali, Laxmipura, Kamod, Vanzar, Badrabad, Visalpur, Bakrol Badrabad, Paldi Kankaj, Ode, Pirana, Gamdi, Devdi, Istolabad, Barejdi, Chosar, Jetalpur, Giramtha, Miroli, Kasindara, Bhat, Navapura, Timba, Mahijda, Vasai, Naj, Bareja, Mithiya, Kathwada, Fatewadi, Lambha (CT), Nandej (CT).

Member of Legislative Assembly
2007 - Babubhai Patel, Bharatiya Janata Party 
2012 - Babubhai Patel, Bharatiya Janata Party

Election candidate

2022

Election results

2017

2012

See also
 List of constituencies of the Gujarat Legislative Assembly
 Ahmedabad district

References

External links
 

Assembly constituencies of Gujarat
Ahmedabad district